Mohammad Reza Zonuzi Motlagh is an Iranian businessman and sports director.

He also owns the ATA Airlines, Tractor S.C., Tabriz Iran khodro, 30% of the shares of Tourism Bank, 34% of the shares of Saman Bank, and industrial factories such as Investment Company Tabriz steel expansion, Dorpad Tabriz industrial group factories, Yaghout Tabriz industry group factories, Tavangaran Sahand Industrial Group, Tabriz Bonyan Diesel plant, Almas Industrial Group Tabriz, and Investment Training Center Gostar Steel Kosar.

References

Living people
Iranian businesspeople
People from Marand
Iranian sports executives and administrators
Iranian company founders
Year of birth missing (living people)